Vera Klute ARHA (born 1981) is a German multi-disciplinary artist based in Dublin, Ireland.

Life
Vera Klute was born in 1981 in Salzkotten, Germany. Klute moved to Ireland to attend Dún Laoghaire Institute of Art, Design and Technology, graduating in 2006. She works in a variety of media, from portraiture to sculpture.

Klute has had a number of solo exhibitions: Wexford Arts Centre (2009), Butler Gallery (2011), QSS Gallery (2014), the LAB and Royal Hibernian Academy (RHA) Ashford (2014), and The Molesworth Gallery (2016). She had her first major solo show at the RHA in 2017. Klute's portrait of Sr Stanislaus Kennedy was added to the National Portrait Collection in the National Gallery of Ireland (NGI) in 2014. A self-portrait of Klute was selected for inclusion in the National Self-portrait Collection of Ireland, and she won the Hennessy Portrait Prize at the NGI in 2015. She won the Hennessy Craig Scholarship in 2015 from the RHA. Klute has been the recipient of the Arts Council Bursary Awards in 2008, 2009, 2011 and 2013. She has also been awarded the Emerging Visual Artist Award from the Wexford Arts Centre in 2009 and the K+M Evans Award from the RHA Annual in 2013.

Klute was commissioned by the Royal Irish Academy in 2017 to create a set of four portraits for their Women on Walls initiative. The portraits were of Françoise Henry, Sheila Tinney, Phyllis Clinch and Eleanor Knott. In 2018, she was elected an Associate Member of the RHA. In January 2019, Klute's sculpture of Luke Kelly was unveiled on Sheriff Street, Dublin having won the commission for work under a competition established the then Lord Mayor of Dublin, Christy Burke.

References

1981 births
Living people
German women sculptors
21st-century sculptors
21st-century German women artists